Olaines Balss is a regional newspaper published in Latvia.

Mass media in Olaine
Newspapers published in Latvia